Yanbian County is located in the northwest of Panzhihua City, Sichuan Province, China and the lower reaches of the Yalong River. It is under the jurisdiction of the prefecture-level city of Panzhihua. The name of Yanbian County is named because of its geographical location on the edge of Yanyuan County. With a total area of 3,269 square kilometers, the population in 2002 was 190,000, and the demographics were Han, Yi, Miao and other ethnic groups.

History

Climate

References

External links 
Official website of Yanbian County Government

County-level divisions of Sichuan